Base de datos is a collaborative online encyclopedia written in the Spanish language launched on 8 December 2002, currently has more than 14,500 articles on all kinds of topics.

Wiki software 

This website has developed its own wiki software called AngelCode with which users can edit articles without registering. However, registered users can use functions whose use is limited by the user experience and to avoid vandalism and copyright problems. For example, only users who have written a number of articles can upload images and photographs.

A difference against other wikis is that the edit history is limited to the last revised edition. Once an edit of Basededatos.com approve an edition, the previous history can not be displayed, and you can not go back to an earlier point.

See also
 Wikipedia
 Citizendium
 Baidu Baike (Chinese)
 Enciclopedia Libre Universal en Español (Spanish)
 List of online encyclopedias

References

Online encyclopedias
Wiki communities
Internet properties established in 2002
Spanish-language websites
Spanish online encyclopedias